John Bell was a member of the Wisconsin State Assembly in 1853. His former home in Spring Prairie, Wisconsin, now known as the John and Margaret Bell House, is listed on the National Register of Historic Places.

References

External links
 John Bell at The Political Graveyard

People from Spring Prairie, Wisconsin
19th-century American politicians
Year of birth missing
Year of death missing
Democratic Party members of the Wisconsin State Assembly